FC Alazani Gurjaani is a Georgian association football club based in Gurjaani in Georgia, founded in 1964 during the Soviet Union.

History
After the independence, the club's biggest achievement was made in the 1992–93 season, when it took the 3rd place in the Umaglesi Liga. During that period the team was led by Otar Gabelia and the name of the club was changed in FC Erkvani Gurjaani. Then in 1993 the name was changed again in Alazani Gurjaani.

In 2014/15 Alazani finished 2nd in Group East of the third league, one point short of the group leader. In 2020 the club participated in Regionuli Liga tournament.

Stadium 
The team play in David Kipiani Stadium in Gurjaani. The field was named in honour of David Kipiani. On 17 September 1992 was held the friendly match between Georgia and Azerbaijan ended 6–3 with 3000 attendances.

Notable Player
  Varlam Kilasonia
  Gurban Gurbanov
  Zurab Popkhadze
  Davit Tsomaia
  Gocha Gujabidze
  Otar Korgalidze
  Davit Janelidze
  Pavle Khorguashvili
  Giorgi Sepashvili

Managers
 1992–1993: Otar Gabelia

Crest and colours

References

External links 
Alazani Gurjaani at footballfacts.ru
Facebook

FC Alazani Gurjaani
Football clubs in Georgia (country)
Association football clubs established in 1962